Quijotoa is a populated place situated in Pima County, Arizona, United States. Historically, it has also been as Horseshoe, Komaktjiuurt, Komaktjuert, Logan, Logan City, and Quigotoa. Its official name became Quijotoa as a result of a decision by the  Board on Geographic Names in 1941, which was subsequently changed to Logan later that same year by the Board. In 1964 the board once again made a ruling, this time changing it back to Quijotoa. Quijotoa is based on the O'odham for "carrying basket mountain", although it is a Spanish bastardized version of it. It is now a ghost town where nothing remains.

References

Populated places in Pima County, Arizona
Ghost towns in Arizona